Maria Christina may refer to:

 Maria Christina, Princess of Transylvania (1574–1621), Princess, briefly sovereign Princess regnant, of Transylvania, by marriage to Sigismund Báthory
 Maria Christina Alexandra, or Queen Christina of Sweden (1626-1689)
 Princess Maria Christina of Saxony (1735–1782), daughter of Augustus III of Poland and Maria Josepha of Austria
 Maria Christina, Duchess of Teschen (1742-1798)
 Princess Maria Christina of Saxony (1770–1851), daughter of Charles of Saxony, Duke of Courland and Franciszka Korwin-Krasińska
 Maria Cristina of Naples and Sicily (1779–1849), Queen Consort of Piedmont-Sardinia
 Maria Christina of the Two Sicilies (1806–1878), Queen Consort and then Regent of Spain, by marriage to Ferdinand VII of Spain
 Infanta Maria Cristina of Spain (1833–1902), daughter of Infante Francisco de Paula of Spain and Princess Luisa Carlotta of Naples and Sicily, and wife of Infante Sebastian of Portugal and Spain
 Maria Christina of Austria (1858–1929), Queen Consort and then Regent of Spain, by marriage to Alfonso XII
 Infanta María Cristina of Spain (1911-1996), daughter of Alfonso XIII of Spain and Victoria Eugenie of Battenberg
 Maria Elfira Christina (born 1986), Indonesian former badminton player
 Maria Christina, the 19th century name for the village of Tamuning, Guam

See also
 Maria Christian, Irish singer